Provincial Trunk Highway 18 (PTH 18) is a provincial highway in the Canadian province of Manitoba. The highway passes through the communities of Killarney and Ninette. It is designated as an RTAC route, meaning it is capable of handling RTAC vehicles such as a truck, a truck and pony trailer, a truck and full trailer, a truck tractor and semi-trailer, an A-train, a B-train, or a C-train.

History 
PTH 18 was designated by 1928 from the United States border to south of Killarney. In 1929, it extended north to Wawanesa, replacing PTH 19.

Route description 

St. John, North Dakota Hwy 30 is the USA port of exit for travelers from the USA to Canada. The rural municipality of Turtle Mountain, Manitoba is located just south of the Turtle Mountains Provincial Park.  At the junction with PR 341 is the unincorporated area of Lena just north of the U.S.– Canada border which provides the Canadian port of entry for travellers from the United States.  PTH 3 demarks the historic Boundary Commission Trail route which connected western communities to the Rocky Mountains of British Columbia.  It ran just south of the community. North-West Mounted Police used the trail, as they travelled west to the Rockies in an effort to tame the prairie. The town of Killarney in Manitoba's Westman Region is situated on the banks of the Killarney Lake.  Agriculture is the main economic mainstay of this region in south Manitoba drawing 1,500 tourists to the lake and cottage country in the summer.  The CPR intersects PTH 18 at Killarney.  Ninette is featured north of Pelican Lake and south of the small Bone Lake. Ninette Marina and the Yacht club Marina provides boat launch and harbour on Pelican Lake, the largest water body of southwestern Manitoba. The CNR intersects PTH 18 at Ninette.  Pelican Lake Agri Fair  and The Pelican Lake Regatta are summer festivals at Ninette.

Traffic volume

Major intersections

See also 
List of Manitoba provincial highways
List of rural municipalities in Manitoba

References

External links 

Manitoba government Official Highway Map
AMM - Association of Manitoba Municipalities
Manitoba Highways

018